This glossary of mycology is a list of definitions of terms and concepts relevant to mycology, the study of fungi. Terms in common with other fields, if repeated here, generally focus on their mycology-specific meaning. Related terms can be found in glossary of biology and glossary of botany, among others. List of Latin and Greek words commonly used in systematic names and Botanical Latin may also be relevant, although some prefixes and suffixes very common in mycology are repeated here for clarity.

A

B

C

D

E

F

G

H

I

J

K

L

M

N

O

P

R

S

T

U

V

W

X

Y

Z

See also
 List of mycologists
 Outline of fungi

References

Bibliography
 
 
 
 
 

Mycology
mycology
Wikipedia glossaries using description lists